Thomas Holford (22 February 1878 – 6 April 1964) was an English footballer who played for Stoke, Manchester City, Port Vale and the England national team. His primary position was wing-half, but over the course of his career he played in many different positions. He later managed Port Vale on two separate occasions, serving throughout World War I, before a three-year spell from 1932 to 1935. He also served the club for many years as a trainer and a scout. In 1924 he turned out for the Vale at the age of 46 years and 68 days, making him one of the oldest ever players in the English Football League.

Early and personal life
Thomas Holford was born on 22 February 1878 in Hanley, Staffordshire. He was the fifth of six children to Thomas Henry and Anna Davis (née Edwards), a potter's manager and potter's sponger respectively. He worked in the pottery industry from at least 1891 to 1921. He married Sarah Jane Platt in 1903, and the couple had two daughters, Lily and Annie.

Club career

Stoke
Holford started his career with Granville's Night School and Cobridge, before he moved on to one of the two local league clubs; Stoke in 1899. He "did not put a foot wrong" in his first seasons at the club, before establishing himself as the centre of Stoke's half-back line between James Bradley and George Baddeley following Alf Wood's departure in March 1901. For the next ten seasons Holford was a near ever-present in the Stoke team, racking up 105 consecutive appearances from March 1903 to March 1906. His good performances won him an England cap in 1903 and he is considered the smallest centre-back ever to play for England at just 5 ft 5. During Holford's time at the club he played the game in a fiery style, although he was never sent off. He succeeded George Baddeley as captain in 1905. Holford's manager Horace Austerberry described him as "an excellent passer of the ball and one who played every match as if it was his last". In 1908 Stoke went bust and dropped out of the English Football League and played in the Birmingham League. Holford was too good to be lost to non-league football and so he had to leave his home-town club, who he played nearly 270 games for.

Manchester City
In April 1908 he signed for First Division Manchester City, making his debut on 21 April against Bristol City, a match which finished goalless. In his first full season at the club he made 27 appearances and was the club's second highest goalscorer with 15 goals, which included three hat-tricks. However, Manchester City finished second-bottom in the First Division, and Holford again suffered relegation. In the 1909–10 season Holford won a Second Division championship medal as his club made an immediate return to the top flight. Though he had been an ever-present in 1912–13, Holford lost his place in the first team in the 1913–14 season, making all but three of his 15 appearances in the first ten weeks of the season. He made his last appearance for Manchester City on 13 April 1914 against Newcastle United, giving him a final total of 183 appearances and 38 goals for the club.

Port Vale
Upon leaving Manchester he was joined Port Vale back in the Potteries as player-manager. He led the side to North Staffordshire Infirmary Cup victory in 1915, but two years later was conscripted into the army to serve as a gunner in the Royal Garrison Artillery. After playing his part in World War I, as well as guesting for Nottingham Forest and Newcastle United, he returned to Vale in the summer of 1919. Regaining his place, he helped the club to win the Staffordshire Senior Cup and share the North Staffordshire Infirmary Cup in 1920. Due to his age he hardly played after October 1920, but played his part in the club's 1922 North Staffordshire Infirmary Cup achievement.

He retired as a player at the end of the 1922–23 season. Over his full career Holford played 474 league games, an exceptionally large number for the period, he had played everywhere except in goal. Upon his retirement he became a trainer for Port Vale, only to make his final appearance on 5 April 1924 at a club record age of 46 years and 68 days. At the time this also made him the second-oldest to play in the Football League, after Billy Meredith, and as of 2008 he is the sixth oldest Football League player of all time.

International career
He won his only England cap on 14 February 1903, in a 4–0 win over Ireland at Molineux.

Style of play
Holford was nicknamed "Dirty Tommy" due to his sometimes reckless tackling. He was also regarded as an excellent passer of the ball.

Managerial career
He had two spells as manager of Port Vale, the first as player-manager from 1914 to 1918 when he was player-manager. His second appointment came in June 1932, with the club in the Second Division. He signed wingers Bob Morton and Jimmy McGrath, and led the Vale to a club record 9–1 victory over Chesterfield on 24 September. After top scorer Stewart Littlewood picked up an injury, he signed ex-England international Louis Page as a replacement; and also boosted the club's defence by signing Len Armitage. In January 1933, he sold left-back Jimmy Oakes to Charlton Athletic for £3,000. His team finished four points above relegation in 1932–33, and he released Billy Easton, Louis Page, Stewart Littlewood, Tom Tippett, Jock Leckie, and Ben Davies, whilst Wilf Kirkham retired.

He signed players such as Trevor Rhodes, Jack Vickers, Ken Gunn, and Billy Tabram, the result of which was an eighth-place finish in 1933–34 – then a record best for the "Valiants". However "the end of an era" followed, as players such as Bill Cope, Sydney Dickinson, Len Armitage, Billy Tabram, Fred Mills, George Poyser, and Jimmy McGrath departed.

In preparation for the 1934–35 campaign, Holford signed goalkeeper John Potts, 'outstanding' outside-right John Friar, inside-left David Galloway, and centre-half Joe Craven. After a good start, results tailed off into a scrap against relegation, and Vale ended up fifth from bottom. Leaving the club in summer 1935 were: James Baker, Bob Morton, Jack Blackwell, Joe Craven, Galloway, Ted Critchley, and Jack Round. He prepared for the 1935–36 season by signing striker George Stabb, centre-half Harry Griffiths, left-winger Arthur Caldwell, left-back Roderick Welsh, and right-half Michael Curley. However he was relieved of his post in September 1935 so that he could concentrate his efforts on scouting. He retired as a scout in 1950, having also been a trainer at the club from July 1939 to July 1946.

Personal life
Holford was a cousin of Wilf Kirkham.

Career statistics

Club
Source:

International
Source:

Managerial

Honours

As a player
Manchester City
Football League Second Division: 1909–10

Port Vale
North Staffordshire Infirmary Cup: 1920 (shared), 1922 (shared)
Staffordshire Senior Cup: 1920

England
British Home Championship: 1902–03 (shared)

As a manager
Port Vale
North Staffordshire Infirmary Cup: 1915

References

1878 births
1964 deaths
Military personnel from Staffordshire
Sportspeople from Hanley, Staffordshire
Association football wingers
English footballers
England international footballers
Stoke City F.C. players
Manchester City F.C. players
Port Vale F.C. players
Nottingham Forest F.C. wartime guest players
Newcastle United F.C. wartime guest players
English Football League players
British Army personnel of World War II
British Army personnel of World War I
Royal Garrison Artillery soldiers
Association football player-managers
English football managers
Port Vale F.C. managers
Association football coaches
Association football scouts
Port Vale F.C. non-playing staff
English Football League managers